The Duty to God Award honor was presented to young men who participated and excelled in their duties in the Aaronic Priesthood within the Church of Jesus Christ of Latter-day Saints. The Duty to God program, which operated in various formats from 1954 until 2019, for young men was roughly equivalent to the Personal Progress program for the church's young women.

History
The award was created in 1954 to align the activities of Scouting with priesthood responsibilities.

In 2002, the award's requirements and design were modified to focus young men on preparation for temple, missionary, and family goals. The award was further modified again in 2010. 

Although the Duty to God award never required participation in the Scouting programs of the Boy Scouts of America (BSA), the BSA recognized it as evidence of a Scout's commitment to its principles. In May 2018, the LDS Church announced that in January 2020 it would launch a new worldwide initiative for children and youth. As a part of this change, the church will no longer be a BSA chartered organization. The new "Children and Youth Program" replaced all existing activity programs for girls and boys, young women and young men beginning in January 2020.

Award requirements
The most recent award program officially began in January 2002 and was revised in 2010.  Aaronic Priesthood candidates would qualify for the Duty to God Award after completing specific requirements regarding priesthood duties. These were defined as involvement in family activities, participation in the church's quorum activities, the successful completion of a Duty to God service project, and reaching personal goals relating to education, spiritual and physical development, and social interactions.

Award name and design 

The award and its qualifying program is named from a passage in the Book of Mormon:  The award, a circular medallion, was designed by Douglas Coy Miles. Before 2002, the award was a buffalo skull-shaped medal designed by Avard Fairbanks.

See also
 Young Men (organization)
 Religious awards for scouting in the Church of Jesus Christ of Latter-day Saints

References

External links
 Award web site
 Children and Youth Development website

2002 in Christianity
Advancement and recognition in the Boy Scouts of America
Awards established in 2002
Latter Day Saint practices
Young Men (organization)
Young people and the Church of Jesus Christ of Latter-day Saints
1954 establishments in the United States